Patricia Albjerg Graham is a historian of American education.  She began her teaching career in Deep Creek, Virginia, and went on to become a lecturer at Indiana University, professor of history and education at Barnard College and TC, Columbia University, dean of the Radcliffe Institute and of Harvard Graduate School of Education.  She was President of the Spencer Foundation from 1991 to 2000.  On May 28, 2015, Graham was awarded an honorary Doctor of Laws by Harvard University.

She is the first female dean at Harvard where there is a chair named after her.

References

21st-century American historians
Year of birth missing (living people)
Living people
Harvard Graduate School of Education faculty
Indiana University faculty
Columbia University faculty
American women historians
21st-century American women writers